Li Ching or Ching Li may refer to:

People surnamed Li
Li Jing (deity), fictional character in Fengshen Yanyi, romanized as "Li Ching" in Wade–Giles
Li Jing (Tang dynasty) (571–649), Chinese general during the Tang, romanized as "Li Ching" in Wade–Giles
Li Jing (Southern Tang) (916–961), Southern Tang emperor, romanized as "Li Ching" in Wade–Giles
 Li Ching (actress) (born 1948), China-born Hong Kong actress
 Li Ching (table tennis) (born 1975), China-born Hong Kong table tennis player

People surnamed Ching
 Ching Li (born 1945), China-born Hong Kong actress

Li Ching may also refer to:
Book of Rites, also known as Classic of Rites (禮經; Li Jing, or Li Ching in Wade–Giles)

See also
 Li Cheng (disambiguation)
 Li Ch'ing (disambiguation)
 Li Jing (disambiguation)